Andrés Tena (born 10 December 1955) is a Dominican Republic boxer. He competed in the men's bantamweight event at the 1980 Summer Olympics.

References

1955 births
Living people
Dominican Republic male boxers
Olympic boxers of the Dominican Republic
Boxers at the 1980 Summer Olympics
Place of birth missing (living people)
Bantamweight boxers